Tilia is a genus of about 30 species of trees or bushes, native throughout most of the temperate Northern Hemisphere. The tree is known as linden for the European species, and basswood for North American species. In Britain and Ireland they are commonly called lime trees, although they are not related to the citrus lime. The genus occurs in Europe and eastern North America, but the greatest species diversity is found in Asia. In Chinese, "椴/duàn" or "椴樹/duànshù" is a general term for Tilia species. Under the Cronquist classification system, this genus was placed in the family Tiliaceae, but genetic research summarised by the Angiosperm Phylogeny Group has resulted in the incorporation of this genus, and of most of the previous family, into the Malvaceae.

As with elms, the exact number of species is uncertain, as many of the species can hybridise readily, both in the wild and in cultivation. They are hermaphroditic, having perfect flowers with both male and female parts, pollinated by insects.

Tilia is the only known ectomycorrhizal genus in the family Malvaceae. Studies of ectomycorrhizal relations of Tilia species indicate a wide range of fungal symbionts and a preference toward Ascomycota fungal partners.

Name 
The genus is generally called "lime" or "linden" in Britain and "linden", "lime", or "basswood" in North America.

"Lime" is an altered form of Middle English lind, in the 16th century also line, from Old English feminine lind or linde, Proto-Germanic *lindō, cognate to Latin lentus "flexible" and Sanskrit latā "liana". Within Germanic languages, English "lithe", German lind "lenient, yielding" are from the same root.

"Linden" was originally the adjective, "made from linwood or lime-wood" (equivalent to "wooden" or "oaken"); from the late 16th century, "linden" was also used as a noun, probably influenced by translations of German romance, as an adoption of Linden, the plural of German Linde.
Neither the name nor the tree is related to the citrus fruit called "lime" (Citrus aurantifolia, family Rutaceae).  Another common name used in North America is basswood, derived from bast, the name for the inner bark (see Uses, below). Teil is an old name for the lime tree.

Latin tilia is cognate to Greek πτελέᾱ, ptelea, "elm tree", τιλίαι, tiliai, "black poplar" (Hes.), ultimately from a Proto-Indo-European word *ptel-ei̯ā with a meaning of "broad" (feminine); perhaps "broad-leaved" or similar.

Description 

The Tilia sturdy trunk stands like a pillar and the branches divide and subdivide into numerous ramifications on which the twigs are fine and thick. In summer, these are profusely clothed with large leaves and the result is a dense head of abundant foliage.

The leaves of all the Tilia species are heart-shaped, and most are asymmetrical. The tiny, pea-like fruit hangs attached to a ribbon-like, greenish-yellow bract whose apparent purpose is to launch the ripened seed clusters just a little beyond the parent tree.  The flowers of the European and American Tilia species are similar, except the American ones bear a petal-like scale among their stamens and the European varieties are devoid of these appendages.  All of the Tilia species may be propagated by cuttings and grafting, as well as by seed.  They grow rapidly in rich soil, but are subject to the attack of many insects. Tilia is notoriously difficult to propagate from seed unless collected fresh in fall. If allowed to dry, the seeds  go into a deep dormancy and take 18 months to germinate.

In particular, aphids are attracted by the rich supply of sap, and are in turn often "farmed" by ants for the production of the sap, which the ants collect for their own use, and the result can often be a dripping of excess sap onto the lower branches and leaves, and anything else below. Cars left under the trees can quickly become coated with a film of the syrup ("honeydew") thus dropped from higher up.  The ant/aphid "farming" process does not appear to cause any serious damage to the trees.

History 

In Europe, some linden trees reached considerable ages.  A coppice of T. cordata in Westonbirt Arboretum in Gloucestershire is estimated to be 2,000 years old.  In the courtyard of the Imperial Castle at Nuremberg is a Tilia, which by tradition recounted in 1900, was planted by the Empress Cunigunde, the wife of Henry II of Germany circa 1000. The Tilia of Neuenstadt am Kocher in Baden-Württemberg, Germany, was estimated at 1000 years old when it fell.  The Alte Linde tree of Naters, Switzerland, is mentioned in a document in 1357 and described by the writer at that time as already magnam (large). A plaque at its foot mentions that in 1155, a linden tree was already on this spot. The Najevnik linden tree, a 700-year-old T. cordata, is the thickest tree in Slovenia. Next to the 英華殿/Yinghua Temple in the Forbidden City in Beijing, there are two Tilia trees planted by Empress Dowager Li, the biological mother of Wanli Emperor about five hundred years ago. 

 The excellence of the honey of the far-famed Hyblaean Mountains was due to the linden trees that covered its sides and crowned its summit.
 Lime fossils have been found in the Tertiary formations of Grinnell Land, Canada, at 82°N latitude, and in Svalbard, Norway.  Sapporta believed he had found there the common ancestor of the Tilia species of Europe and America.

Uses 

The linden is recommended as an ornamental tree when a mass of foliage or a deep shade is desired. It produces fragrant and nectar-producing flowers and is an important honey plant for beekeepers, giving rise to a pale but richly flavoured monofloral honey. In European and North American herbal medicine, the flowers are also used for herbal teas and tinctures. The flowers are used for herbal tea in the winter in Greece and Turkey. In China, dried Tilia flowers are also used to make tea. 

In English landscape gardens, avenues of linden trees were fashionable, especially during the late 17th and early 18th centuries. Many country houses have a surviving "lime avenue" or "lime walk", the example at Hatfield House was planted between 1700 and 1730. The fashion was derived from the earlier practice of planting lindens in lines as shade trees in Germany, the Netherlands, Belgium and northern France. Most of the trees used in British gardens were cultivars propagated by layering in the Netherlands.

Wood 

Linden trees produce soft and easily worked timber, which has very little grain and a density of 560 kg/m3. It was often used by Germanic tribes for constructing shields. It is a popular wood for model building and for intricate carving.  Especially in Germany, it was the classic wood for sculpture from the Middle Ages onwards and is the material for the elaborate altarpieces of Veit Stoss, Tilman Riemenschneider, and many others.  In England, it was the favoured medium of the sculptor Grinling Gibbons (1648–1721). The wood is used in marionette- and puppet-making and -carving. Having a fine, light grain and being comparatively light in weight, it has been used for centuries for this purpose; despite the availability of modern alternatives, it remains one of the main materials used . In China, it was also widely used in carving or furniture, interior decorating, handicrafts ... etc. 

Ease of working and good acoustic properties also make limewood popular for electric and bass guitar bodies and for wind instruments such as recorders. Percussion manufacturers sometimes use Tilia as a material for drum shells, both to enhance their sound and for their aesthetics.

Linden wood is also the material of choice for window blinds and shutters.  Real-wood blinds are often made from this lightweight but strong and stable wood, which is well suited to natural and stained finishes.

In China, “冻蘑/dongmo” grows well on decomposing logs of Tilia trees in the old-growth forest; therefore, people use logs of Tilia trees to cultivate S. edulis and even Black fungus or shiitake mushrooms with excellent results. Currently, "椴木黑木耳/Tilia-logs-black fungus" or "椴木香菇/Tilia-logs-shiitake mushrooms" has become a term for a method of cultivating black fungus and shiitake mushrooms, "椴木/Tilia-logs" is no longer exclusively refers to Tilia trees, and also refers to other woods suitable for black fungus or shiitake mushrooms cultivation.

Bark 
Known in the trade as basswood, particularly in North America, its name originates from the inner fibrous bark of the tree, known as bast.  A strong fibre is obtained from the tree by peeling off the bark and soaking it in water for a month, after which the inner fibres can be easily separated. Bast obtained from the inside of the bark of the Tilia japonica tree has been used by the Ainu people of Japan to weave their traditional clothing, the attus. Excavations in Britain have shown that lime tree fibre was preferred for clothing there during the Bronze Age. The Manchu people in the mountains of Northeast China made ropes, baskets, coir raincoats, large fishing nets, and guide lines for gunpowder from the bast. Similar fibres obtained from other plants are also called bast: see Bast fibre.

Nectar 
Tilia is a high-quality wild honey plant. In China, "椴树蜜/Tilia honey" is produced in the northeast region. White in color, it is called "white honey" or "snow honey". Heilongjiang is well-known throughout the country for producing high-quality "Tilia honey": Heilongjiang not only has lush Tilia trees, but also a rare and excellent bee species - "东北黑蜂/Northeast Black Bee" to collect honey（Raohe County is the location of the national "东北黑蜂自然保护区/Northeast Black Bee Nature Reserve". It is the only nature reserve for bees in Asia.). "Tilia honey" mainly comes from Tilia amurensis and Tilia mandshurica. "Tilia honey" and southern "longan honey" and "lychee honey" are called "China's three famous honeys". "Tilia honey", "rape honey" and "black acacia honey" are the three most productive honeys in China.

Phytochemicals 
The dried flowers are mildly sweet and sticky, and the fruit is somewhat sweet and mucilaginous. Linden flower tea has a pleasing taste, due to the aromatic volatile oil found in the flowers. Phytochemicals in the Tilia flowers include flavonoids and tannins with astringent properties.

The nectar contains a major secondary metabolite with the trivial name tiliaside (1-[4-(1-hydroxy-1-methylethyl)-1,3-cyclohexadiene-1-carboxylate]-6-O-β-D-glucopyranosyl-β-D-glucopyranose) which is transformed in the gut of bumblebees to the aglycone (i.e., the gentiobiose group is cleaved) which is bioactive against a common and debilitating gut parasite of bumblebees, Crithidia bombi. This naturally occurring compound may support bees to manage the burden of disease - one of the major contributors to pollinator decline.

Other uses
Usually, the double-flowered species are used to make perfumes.  The leaf buds and young leaves are also edible raw.

Tilia species are used as food plants by the larvae of some Lepidoptera; see List of Lepidoptera that feed on Tilia.

Classification 
This list comprises the most widely accepted species, hybrids, and cultivars".

Species 

 Tilia americana L. – American basswood, American linden
 Tilia amurensis – Amur lime, Amur linden
 Tilia caroliniana – Carolina basswood
 Tilia chinensis – Chinese linden
 Tilia chingiana Hu & W.C.Cheng
 Tilia cordata Mill. – Small-leaved lime, little-leaf linden or greenspire linden
 Tilia dasystyla Steven
 Tilia henryana Szyszyl. – Henry's lime, Henry's linden
 Tilia hupehensis – Hubei lime
 Tilia insularis
 Tilia intonsa
 Tilia japonica – Japanese lime, shina (when used as a laminate)
 †Tilia johnsoni Wolfe & Wehr Eocene; Washington and British Columbia
 Tilia kiusiana
 Tilia mandshurica – Manchurian lime
 Tilia maximowicziana
 Tilia miqueliana
 Tilia mongolica Maxim. – Mongolian lime, Mongolian linden
 Tilia nasczokinii – Nasczokin's lime, Nasczokin's linden
 Tilia nobilis
 Tilia officinarum
 Tilia oliveri – Oliver's lime
 Tilia paucicostata
 Tilia platyphyllos Scop. – large-leaved lime
 Tilia rubra – Red stem lime (syn. T. platyphyllos var. rubra)
 Tilia tomentosa Moench – silver lime, silver linden
 Tilia tuan Szyszyl.

Hybrids and cultivars 
 Tilia × euchlora (T. dasystyla × T. cordata)
 Tilia × europaea – Common lime (T. cordata × T. platyphyllos; syn. T. × vulgaris)
 Tilia × petiolaris (T. tomentosa × T. ?)
 Tilia 'Flavescens' – Glenleven linden (T. americana × T. cordata)
 Tilia 'Moltkei' (T. americana × T. petiolaris)
 Tilia 'Orbicularis' (hybrid, unknown origin)
 Tilia 'Spectabilis' (hybrid, unknown origin)

Gallery

See also 
 International World War Peace Tree, a Tilia tree that stands as a sign of Germany's armistice with the United States
 Lime tree in culture
 Matryoshka doll, made from linden trees
 St Lawrence Lime, a former lime tree in Canterbury, England

References

Bibliography

External links 

 
 

 
Malvaceae genera
Medicinal plants
Taxa named by Carl Linnaeus